The Laurence Miller Gallery is a contemporary art gallery in New York City, and has been described as "one of the longest-running American galleries devoted to photography".

History
The proprietor of the gallery, Laurence Miller, began his gallery career with the Quivira Photography Gallery in New Mexico, where Miller was affiliated with the art department of University of New Mexico. After serving as assistant director of the Light Gallery in New York, and a showing of his own photographs at the M.F.A. Gallery of the Rochester Institute of Technology, Miller opened a gallery in his own name in 1984 on East 57th Street. In 1986, the gallery moved to a larger space on Spring Street, and moved to West 57th Street in 1998. The following year, the gallery published a portfolio of prints by late photojournalist Larry Burrows, with the assistance of his son Russell Burrows.

In 1995 it was reported that the gallery "specializes in showing established contemporary photographers in its main room", with an exhibit at that time titled "Berlin Before the Wall" featuring the work of German photographer Arno Fischer. The gallery was further reported as mounting "exhibitions of vintage prints in its smaller, adjoining space". In 1999, Miller advocated for giving equal treatment to digital and non-digital photography, stating that "[y]ou wouldn't ask a poet, 'Did you use a keyboard or a pen to write your poem?'" By 2005, it was reported that the gallery "has presented more than two hundred exhibitions that span the history of photography". In 2014, the gallery celebrated its 30th Anniversary "with a show of work by 31 photographers it has represented or shown over the years". The gallery participated in The Armory Show in 2019.

As of 2020, the gallery was located at 521 West 26th Street, in Chelsea, Manhattan.

Notable exhibitions
Peter Bialobrzeski, "Neon Tigers" (March 25 - May 15, 2004)
Barbara Blondeau, "Permutations" (June 3 - July 1, 2010)
Luca Campigotto, "Gotham and Beyond" (2013)
Petah Coyne (1997)
Stephanie Couturier (2007)
Arno Fischer, "Berlin Before the Wall"  (1995)
Lee Friedlander, "Cherry Blossom Time in Japan" (November 12 - December 13, 1986)
"Cray at Chippewa Falls" (1988)
"Like a One-Eyed Cat: Photographs by Lee Friedlander 1956-1987" (1989)
"A Selection of Nudes" (1991)
"Work in Progress/Sonora Desert" (1991)
David Graham, "Where We Live" (2015); other exhibitions (1987, 1989, 1991)
Philippe Halsman (2010)
Fred Herzog, "Betwixt and Between" (2019)
Les Krims, "Fictions 1969-1974" (2004)
Mark Mann, "Portfolios: Seeing in Series" (2006)
Ray Metzker (2014)
Maggie Taylor, "Landscape of Dreams" (September 15, 2005 - October 29, 2005)
Burk Uzzle (2009) 
Bruce Wrighton, "Downtown Men" (2014)

References

Art museums and galleries in Manhattan
1984 establishments in New York City